PT Jababeka Tbk is the first publicly listed industrial estate developer in Indonesia, being listed on the Jakarta and Surabaya Stock Exchange under the "KJIA" ticker symbol in 1994. It was established in 1989 by Setyono Djuandi Darmono, marked by the development of an integrated city in some 5,600 hectares of land which is Kota Jababeka in Cikarang. As an industrial estate developer, Jababeka creates an industry-based township through developing industrial, residential, commercial property, leisure, infrastructure and estate management service.

History and milestones 

PT Jababeka Tbk was established in 1989. In the same year, the development of industrial estate took place in Cikarang, known as Jababeka Industrial Estate, while the residential estate was started being developed three years later. In 1994, PT Jababeka Tbk was listed on Jakarta and Surabaya stock exchange, making it the first publicly listed industrial estate developer in Indonesia. Then in 1996, there were acquisitions of Menara Batavia in Jakarta CBD and also 1,000 ha industrial land in Cilegon, Banten.  Still in the same year, PT Jababeka Tbk inaugurated the Jababeka Golf and Country Club in Jababeka. Then in 2001, there was inauguration of Education Park, including President University.

Development was still going on with the next project was the development of Jababeka Central Business District (CBD) in Cikarang in the year of 2003, and continued with the groundbreaking of 130 MW Power Plant project in 2007 as well as Medical City in 2008. Besides the power plant, another infrastructure developed was the dry port. Cikarang Dry Port started operations in 2010 and appointed as an Integrated Customs Services Zone with international port code IDJBK. In 2011, PT Jababeka Tbk acquired 1,500 ha land in Tanjung Lesung, Banten. Next development was the Kendal Industrial Estate in Central Java while in Jababeka, Bekasi Power started operating in 2013. By 2014 PT Jababeka Tbk achieved over IDR 2.5 trillion in revenue. In 2015, development of US$1 billion Plaza Indonesia Jababeka township project was begun.

Products and services

Industrial
The Jababeka Industrial Estate in Kota Jababeka, Cikarang, Bekasi, West Java is the first modern Indonesian eco-industrial estate and jointly developed with ProLH GTZ under a technical cooperation program collaboratively established by Indonesia's Ministry of Environment and the Republic of Germany. The industrial estate includes industrial land lot, built-to suit factories, Biz Park Jababeka and logistic buildings. It spans in more than 2,000 hectares of land and contains more than 1,650 local and multinational corporations from 30 countries, such as United States, Japan, France, United Kingdom, the Netherlands, Australia, Korea, Singapore, Taiwan, and Malaysia.

Residential
Jababeka’s Residential Estate is set in the heart of Kota Jababeka, Cikarang, Bekasi, West Java where professionals who work in Jababeka's Industrial Estate reside. The development of the residential estate known as Jababeka Residence started back in 1992. It lies on a 1,400 hectares land and consists of around 50,000 housing units catering for all social strata as it comprises various types of residential clusters.

Commercial
Jababeka's commercial products include commercial plots of land, shophouses, office and commercial space for rent which is located in Kota Jababeka, Cikarang, Bekasi, West Java. The Jababeka Central Business District contains various commercial facilities which are shops, restaurants and banks. This area is commonly used by youngsters from local schools and universities, faculty members, entrepreneurs, professionals and many others to have social interactions.

Infrastructure
Infrastructures in Jababeka are built to support the growth of its estates. The power plant which is managed by PT Bekasi Power, a subsidiary of PT Jababeka Tbk, supports the continuity of Uninterruptible Power Supply (UPS) operation for seven industrial estates in eastern Jakarta, especially Jababeka industrial area. It also cooperates with the state electricity company or Perusahaan Listrik Negara (PLN) to support government programs in electricity distribution in Bekasi and Karawang’s industrial areas.  Another infrastructure developed by Jababeka is the dry port called Cikarang Dry Port which allows import-export customs clearance to be resolved within the Jababeka industrial area. Besides the power plant and the dry port, Jababeka develops water treatment plant units as well as waste water management.

Estate management
In addition to the water and waste water treatment plant, Jababeka provides network of fiber optics powered by PT Telkom Indonesia, PT. Indonesia Comnet Plus (Icon+) dan PT Indosat. Jababeka has invested in road improvement and drainage services program, in-house fire brigade and fire hydrants, 24-hour security, public lighting and public transportation, all of which fall under Jababeka's estate management services.

Leisure and hospitality
Some products of Jababeka's leisure and hospitality are Jababeka Golf and Country Club, Borobudur International Golf & Country Club, President Lounge, Metro Suites and Metro Hotel.

Corporate affairs and identity

Facts and figures
Jababeka was established in 1989. One of the major works of Jababeka is Kota Jababeka in Cikarang, Bekasi, West Java. As of 2017 Jababeka employs more than 700,000 workers and 10,000 expatriates in order to support the creation of employment opportunities in Indonesia. Jababeka becomes home base to some tenants which are Loreal, ICI Paints, Mattel, Samsung, Unilever, United Tractors, Akzo Nobel and Nissin Mas.

Besides Kota Jababeka in Cikarang, Jababeka continues working with keen regional governments in Indonesia to develop more cities. Ongoing projects are Kota Jababeka, Tanjung Lesung (Tanjung Lesung SEZ), Kendal (Kendal Industrial Estate), Morotai (Jababeka Morotai SEZ) and Cilegon. Potential cities to be developed are Bengkulu, Cirebon, Tuban/Madura, Banda Aceh, Medan, Sei Mangkei, Padang, Bintan, Bangka Belitung, Yogyakarta, Pontianak, Balikpapan, Tuban, Bitung, Palu, Takalar, Ende, Flores, Ambon, Sorong, Kaimana.

Management team

Board of commissioners
 Setyono Djuandi Darmono – Chairman & Founder
 Hadi Rahardja – Co-Chairman & Founder
 Bacelius Ruru – Vice President Commissioner / Independent Commissioner
 Gan Michael – Commissioner
 Ketut Budi Wijaya – Commissioner / Independent Commissioner

Board of directors
 T. Budianto Liman – President Director
 Hyanto Wihadhi – Director
 Sutedja Sidarta Darmono – Director
 Tjahjadi Rahardja – Director
 Setiawan Mardjuki – Director

Subsidiaries 
 PT Jababeka Infrastruktur
 PT Gerbang Teknologi Cikarang
 PT Bekasi Power
 PT Cikarang Inland Port
 PT Indokargomas Persada
 PT Metropark Condominium Indah
 PT Jababeka Morotai
 PT Graha Buana Cikarang
 PT Padang Golf Cikarang
 PT Saranapratama Pengembangan Kota
 PT Mercuagung Graha Realty
 PT Banten West Java Tourism Development
 PT Tanjung Lesung Leisure Industry
 Jababeka International BV
 Jababeka Finance BV

Corporate social responsibility

Economic empowerment
Jababeka works with Small and Medium Enterprises (SME) to increase their capabilities to earn income, and encourages small organic farmers to succeed in the agribusiness sector. Moreover, Jababeka also assists with general infrastructure development and repairs, particularly of waterworks and roads, to support quality of life for residents of local communities.

Social welfare
Jababeka provides free medical services for the underprivileged, supports government health programmes, helps construct and renovate schools and libraries, and gives scholarships to high achieving underprivileged children.

Environment
Jababeka has established an 11-ha Botanic Garden to help preserve biodiversity and serve as green "lungs" for the surrounding residents.

Awards
 Supply Chain Asia Awards 2014 – Asia Logistics Centre/Park of the Year Cikarang Dry Port
 Frontier Consulting Group Award – Rank #1 Corporate Image 2014 in category Industrial Estate
 Fortune Indonesia Magazine – Ranks 10th in the 50 Fastest Growing Companies, 2013
 Kemenperin Award  – 	The Best Performance in Infrastructure and Facilities, 2013
 Forbes Indonesia  –  Best Company Award, 2012
 Investor Magazine Award – Top 10 Best Performing Listed Companies and Best Listed Companies in Property and Building Construction, 2012
 PROPER Awards 2009 & 2011 
 Green Property Awards 2011
 Green Property Award 2009
 Indonesian CSR Award 2008
 Participation and Support for Housing Development Award, 2008
 Laboratory Examiner Award, 2008

References

External links
 Jababeka

1989 establishments in Indonesia
1994 initial public offerings
Real estate companies of Indonesia
Companies listed on the Indonesia Stock Exchange
Indonesian companies established in 1989